Whitcott Keysett is a hamlet in south Shropshire, England. It is located two miles northwest of the small town of Clun.

The west half of the settlement lies in the civil parish of Newcastle-on-Clun whilst the east half lies in Clun.

See also
Listed buildings in Clun
Listed buildings in Newcastle on Clun

External links
 

Clun
Hamlets in Shropshire